The Wynyard Football Club is an Australian rules football club based in Wynyard, Tasmania.

Club history
The Wynyard Football Club was believed to be formed in 1885 as Table Cape and adopted the name of Wynyard in 1890.

The Wynyard Cats entered the North West Football Union (NWFU) in 1925 after playing in a variety of competitions for the first four decades.

The Cats were involved with the infamous "Goalpost Final" against North Hobart at West Park Oval in 1967, which was declared a "no result" after hundreds of fans invaded the ground and tore down the goalposts as North Hobart full-forward David "Dickie" Collins went back to take a kick after the siren with Wynyard leading by one point.

In 1987, Wynyard joined the new Northern Tasmanian Football League (which was renamed the North West Football League in 2015), and has competed there since. Wynyard broke a 33-year premiership drought in 2012, with a 13-point Grand Final victory over Latrobe; and in 2014 they defeated Ulverstone by 116 points in the Grand Final to win a second premiership in three years. The following year, the Cats went “back to back” winning another senior premiership for the first time in 125 years.

Club details
Home Ground:
Wynyard Football Ground, Austin Street Wynyard, Tasmania.

Colours:
Navy Blue with a white "WFC" Emblem

Premiership titles
Senior Premierships (NWFU):
1952
1967
1975
1979

Senior Premierships (NTFL/NWFL):
2012
2014
2015

League Best and Fairest Winners (NWFU):
1930 - E O'Brien & Jack Stewart (Wright Medal)
1945 - Len Hayes
1953 - Darrell Eaton (Wander Medal)
1961 - Lloyd Robson (Wander Medal)
1977 - Ricky Smith (Wander Medal)

League Best and Fairest Winners (NTFL/NWFL):
1987 - Anthony Flint (Ovaltine Medal)
2012 - Sam Douglas (Darrel Baldock Medal)
2014 - Sam Douglas (Darrel Baldock Medal)
2015 - Zac Smith (Darrel Baldock Medal)
2017 - Dylan Smith (Darrel Baldock Medal)
2018 - Sam Douglas (Darrel Baldock Medal)

Alstergen Trophy Winners:
1968 - John Neal
1976 - Ricky Smith

League Leading Goal Kickers (NWFU):
1949 - R Rocher (81)
1950 - R Rocher (69)
1953 - W Baker (45)
1955 - W Baker (39)
1959 - R London(68)
1963 - R London(51)
1967 - J Coughlan (81)
1968 - J Coughlan (92)
1974 - A Hodgetts (69)
1977 - K Madden(83)

League Leading Goal Kickers (NTFL/NWFL):
1987 - K Taylor (141)
1995 - G Williams (80)
1999 - G Williams (60)
2014 - G Sharman (130)
2015 - G Sharman (109)

 Notable Players:
Colin Robertson
Chris Bond
Alistair Lynch
Robert “Scratcher” Neal
Simon Atkins
Paul Atkins
Joe Littler

References

Wynyard Football Club Official Site
Northern Tasmanian Football League Official Site
Full Points Footy:Wynyard

Australian rules football clubs in Tasmania
1885 establishments in Australia
Australian rules football clubs established in 1885
North West Football League clubs
Wynyard, Tasmania